Kotli Lehal is a village in Batala in Gurdaspur district of Punjab State, India. The village is administrated by a sarpanch, an elected representative of the village.

Demography 
, the village has a total population of 999(subdivided into 196 houses), of which 509 are male and 490 are female.  According to the report published by Census India in 2011, out of the total population of the village, 303 people are from Schedule Caste and the village does not have any Schedule Tribe population so far.

See also
List of villages in India

References

External links 
 Tourism of Punjab
 Census of Punjab

Villages in Gurdaspur district